Atari is a village in Shaheed Bhagat Singh Nagar district of Punjab State, India. The village is administrated by Sarpanch an elected representative of the village.

Demography 
As of 2011, Atari has a total number of 129 houses and population of 628 of which 316 include are males while 312 are females according to the report published by Census India in 2011. The literacy rate of Atari is 72.92%, lower than the state average of 85.26%. The population of children under the age of 6 years is 58 which is 9.24% of total population of Atari, and child sex ratio is approximately 871 as compared to Punjab state average of 846.

Most of the people are from Schedule Caste which constitutes 63.38% of total population in Atari. The town does not have any Schedule Tribe population so far.

As per the report published by Census India in 2011, 236 people were engaged in work activities out of the total population of Atari which includes 200 males and 36 females. According to census survey report 2011, 85.59% workers describe their work as main work and 14.41% workers are involved in Marginal activity providing livelihood for less than 6 months.

Education 
The village has a Punjabi medium, co-ed primary school founded in 1964. The schools provide mid-day meal which prepared in School premises as per Indian Midday Meal Scheme. The school provide free education to children between the ages of 6 and 14 as per Right of Children to Free and Compulsory Education Act.

Amardeep Singh Shergill Memorial college Mukandpur and Sikh National College Banga.

Transport 

See also 
List of villages in India

References

External links 
 Tourism of Punjab 
 Census of Punjab
 Locality Based PINCode

Villages in Shaheed Bhagat Singh Nagar district